

Francis Seth Frost (1825–1902) or F.S. Frost was a painter, photographer, and businessman specializing in artists' materials. Based in Boston, Massachusetts, he travelled widely in the United States. Friends included Albert Bierstadt. Frost kept an art studio in the Studio Building on Tremont Street in Boston. In 1869 with E.H. Adams he began the artists' supply firm, Frost & Adams, which flourished into the 20th century.

References

Further reading
 Houston, Jourdan.  "Francis Seth Frost (1825-1902), Beyond Bierstadt's Shadow."  American Art Review, August–September 1994 146–157.

External links

 Smith College. Francis Seth Frost (1825–1902). South Pass, Wind River Mountains, Wyoming, 1860. Oil on canvas.
Hood Museum .  Francis Seth Frost. Moat Mountain, Intervale, New Hampshire. About 1872. Oil on canvas
 White Mountain Art & Artists
 New Hampshire Historical Society. Frost
 Smith College. South Pass, Wind River Mountains, Wyoming by Francis Seth Frost

Images

1825 births
1902 deaths
Artists from Boston
19th century in Boston
19th-century American painters
American male painters
20th-century American painters
Cultural history of Boston
American photographers
Economic history of Boston
19th-century American male artists
20th-century American male artists